The Alameda Science and Technology Institute (ASTI) is an early college high school in Alameda, California, United States.

School description 
Alameda Science and Technology Institute is located on the campus of the College of Alameda in Alameda's West End neighborhood. First opened in 2004, ASTI is a collaboration between Alameda Unified School District (AUSD) and the College of Alameda. ASTI was planned and conceived as a small high school providing a rigorous college preparatory curriculum to students living in the San Francisco Bay Area. Students earn two years of college credit during their junior and senior years. The ASTI program actively implements project-centered learning and inquiry-based instruction in a teamwork setting, resulting in interdisciplinary work that spans the major content areas.

Physical plant 
Originally located in an abandoned upholstery shop at the College of Alameda, in 2006 ASTI installed the last of seven modular buildings, achieving autonomy as a high school co-located on a college campus. In 2007–2008, ASTI created a new science lab classroom and new technology lab. In 2013–14, ASTI added a school garden adjacent to the College of Alameda gym. In 2015-16 a permanent school sign was installed in front of the school garden.

About the school 
As an early college high school, Alameda Science and Technology Institute is unique in its approach to secondary education. One of the first early college high schools in California to receive funding through a grant made available by the Bill and Melinda Gates Foundation and others, ASTI's funding intermediaries are the Foundation for California Community Colleges and Jobs for the Future.

Governance structure 
From its inception in 2004 until 2008, a series of four principals oversaw ASTI; from 2008 to 2011 it functioned under a teacher-leader model. Operations were overseen by the teacher-leader, and a district liaison helped resolve larger issues. In 2011 the teacher-leader was named "principal". AUSD and ASTI staff cooperate jointly to help direct the program, working closely with a college liaison who serves as a dean at the community college.

State and district requirements 
Alameda Science and Technology has defined an "ASTI Course of Study" that aligns Alameda Unified School District and State of California graduation requirements with the requirements of the College of Alameda required for transfer to four-year universities. ASTI emphasizes a freshman and sophomore core curriculum that supports student preparation for college preparation through enrollment in courses that concentrate on transfer of skills in reading, writing, speaking and critical thinking.  ASTI ensures all students are involved in challenging learning experiences through its deliberate focus on rigorous and accelerated instruction in a well-defined academic course of study.  The ASTI curriculum explicitly provides for reinforcement of literacy in areas that are crucial to college success. Through its concentration on writing and speaking, ASTI prepares its students with the skills necessary to promote college-level language production and content presentation.  Students are involved in a strand of interdisciplinary projects that align disparate subject areas:  in this manner, ASTI teachers scaffold and structure student learning experiences to consciously aim at individual assignments and group projects of increasing difficulty and progressing complexity.

Teaching methods 
ASTI teachers use a variety of strategies and resources to actively engage students and emphasize higher-order thinking skills. Emphasis is placed upon productive class discussions, use of textual evidence, application of scientific method, error analysis and group projects. Teachers use collaboration time to identify individual student learning strengths and challenges. Early on, ASTI made a commitment to embed computer technology and media literacy into its curriculum and instruction. In 2007 ASTI finalized its dream of building a dedicated state-of-the-art technology lab as well as a science lab to match its theme-based emphases on science and technology; in 2013 the school acquired a ChromeCart funded by the district, which allows students to work online in any classroom.

Awards and recognition 
In 2017, ASTI was awarded with a California Gold Ribbon of Excellence, as well as earning a California Green Ribbon at the silver recognition level.

In 2016, ASTI was awarded its second consecutive six-year accreditation term from the Western Association of Schools and Colleges. This is the longest term any school can be awarded by the association.

In September 2015, ASTI was announced as one of 335 schools nationwide to receive prestigious National Blue Ribbon School recognition.

In 2013, 2014, and 2015, ASTI was selected by Educational Results Partnership (ERP) and the Campaign for Business and Education Excellence (CBEE)  as one of 1,714 public schools in California to receive the title of 2015 Honor Roll school.

In 2010, 2011, 2012, 2013 and 2014, ASTI was recognized by U.S. News & World Report with Bronze Medal status; this is the highest medal awarded to a school that does not have an AP program. ASTI offers college enrollment instead of AP courses.

API performance 

ASTI has the highest API out of all the public high schools in Alameda Unified School District.

References

External links 
 

High schools in Alameda County, California
Public high schools in California
Educational institutions established in 2004
2004 establishments in California